The Lake Winnipesaukee mystery stone is an alleged out-of-place artifact (OOPArt) found in a town near Lake Winnipesaukee in New Hampshire. The stone's age, purpose and origin are unknown.

Carvings on one side of the stone show an ear of corn and several other figures. The other side is more abstract, featuring inverted arrows, a moon shape, some dots and a spiral.

History
The stone was reportedly found in 1872 in Meredith, New Hampshire, by workers digging a hole for a fence post. Seneca Ladd, a Meredith businessman who hired the workers, was given credit for the discovery. In 1892, upon Ladd's death, the stone passed to Frances Ladd Coe of Center Harbor, one of his daughters. In 1927, she donated the stone to the New Hampshire Historical Society.

The stone is currently on exhibit at the Museum of New Hampshire History.

Analysis and interpretation
A contemporary source suggested that the stone "commemorates a treaty between two tribes". Another writer later suggested that it is a thunderstone. With the somewhat limited understanding of the day, the letter said that thunderstones "always present the appearance of having been machined or hand-worked: frequently they come from deep in the earth, embedded in lumps of clay, or even surrounded by solid rock or coral".
 
In 1994, a borescope analysis of the stone's holes was performed. State archaeologist Richard Boisvert later suggested that the holes had the appearance of having been drilled by power tools from the 19th or 20th century:

I've seen a number of holes bored in stone with technology that you would associate with prehistoric North America. There's a certain amount of unevenness ... and this hole was extremely regular throughout. What we did not see was variations that would be consistent with something that was several hundred years old.

Scratches in the lower bore suggest it was placed on a metal shaft and removed several times.

Analysis has concluded the stone is a type of quartzite.

References 

Pseudoarchaeology
1872 in the United States
Mystery Stone